Zainab Lawal Gummi is the commissioner for Education of Zamfara State of Nigeria. She was  appointed by governor Bello Matawalle.

Career 
Gummi has stated that she supports free access to education and gender equality. She also stated that their state was committed to ending all forms of child abuse such as destitution, trafficking and child labour.  It would be achieved through traditional rulers and engagement of Islamic scholars to help guide the implementation of laws.

References 

Nigerian women in politics
People from Zamfara State
Living people
Hausa people
Government ministers of Nigeria
Year of birth missing (living people)